The highscale shiner (Notropis hypsilepis) is a species of ray-finned fish in the genus Notropis. It is endemic to the United States where it is found in sandy substrate tributary streams of the Chattahoochee and Flint river systems in Georgia and eastern Alabama.

References 

 
 Highscale Shiner on Georgia Biodiversity Portal

Notropis
Fish described in 1955